Delphinidin 3-O-(6-p-coumaroyl)glucoside is a p-coumaroylated anthocyanin. It can be found in some red Vitis vinifera grape cultivars (like Graciano) and in red wine.

It is formed by the enzyme anthocyanin 3-O-glucoside 6-O-hydroxycinnamoyltransferase|anthocyanin 3-O-glucoside 6″-O''-hydroxycinnamoyltransferase from delphinidin 3-O-glucoside and p-coumaroyl-CoA in the anthocyanin biosynthesis pathway.

See also 
 Phenolic compounds in wine

References 

Anthocyanins
Phenylpropanoids
Cinnamate esters
Glucosides